The canton of Oyonnax-Nord is a former administrative division in eastern France. It was disbanded following the French canton reorganisation which came into effect in March 2015. It had 17,122 inhabitants (2012).

The canton comprised 5 communes:
Arbent
Belleydoux
Dortan
Échallon
Oyonnax (partly)

Demographics

See also
Cantons of the Ain department

Notes

Former cantons of Ain
2015 disestablishments in France
States and territories disestablished in 2015